Kramarzewo may refer to the following places:
Kramarzewo, Podlaskie Voivodeship (north-east Poland)
Kramarzewo, Działdowo County in Warmian-Masurian Voivodeship (north Poland)
Kramarzewo, Olsztyn County in Warmian-Masurian Voivodeship (north Poland)